Walter Hibshman Craig (February 24, 1880 – November 25, 1937) was an American politician from Pennsylvania who served as a Republican member of the Pennsylvania House of Representatives for Delaware County from 1923 to 1925.

Early life
Craig was born in Chester, Pennsylvania.  He graduated from Chester High School and attended Pierce Business College.

Career
Craig worked as president of Penn Ice Works, Inc. from 1901 to 1920 and as proprietor of Penn Purity Ice Cream from 1914 to 1920.

He was elected to the Pennsylvania House of Representatives for Delaware County and served from 1923 to 1925.  He resigned from the House on September 1, 1925 and was replaced by Edward Nothnagle by special election on January 5, 1926.

He was elected to the Chester City Council and served from 1925 to 1937 including as the director of parks and public property from 1925 to 1935 and as director of accounts and finances from 1935 to 1937.

He died in Chester, Pennsylvania and is interred at the Chester Rural Cemetery.

Personal life
Craig was married to Etta James.  He was a member of the Free & Accepted Masons.

References

1880 births
1937 deaths
20th-century American politicians
American Freemasons
Burials at Chester Rural Cemetery
Chester High School alumni
Republican Party members of the Pennsylvania House of Representatives
Pennsylvania city council members
People from Chester, Pennsylvania